WACC (830 AM) is a radio station broadcasting a Spanish Religious format. Licensed to Hialeah, Florida, United States.  The station is currently owned by Radio Peace Catholic Broadcasting, Inc.

History
The station went on the air as WTIW on November 8, 1984. On May 28, 1987, the station changed its call sign to WRFM, on April 3, 1995, to WXTO, then on December 1, 1997, to the current WACC,

References

External links

Radio stations established in 1984
1984 establishments in Florida
ACC